The Briar Cliff Review is a literary journal based in Sioux City, Iowa, USA, home of Briar Cliff University.  The Review was founded in 1989 and has awarded its well-renowned prizes in fiction and poetry since 1996.  The current editors are Tricia Currans-Sheehan, Phil Hey (Fiction), Jeanne Emmons (Poetry) and Paul Weber (Nonfiction).

Previous winners of the Briar Cliff Review fiction prize include Jacob M. Appel's "The Final Word in Bee Keeping" (2000),  Jasmine Beach-Ferrara's "A Caveat" (2003), Rebecca Tuch's "Stop Saying My Name" (2006), and Scott H. Andrews's "A Brief Swell of Twilight" (2007).  Winning poets include Elizabeth Volpe (2004) and Deborah DeNicola (2007) and Cris Miller (2011).

Jenna Blum's short story Those Who Save Us first appeared in the 14th issue of The Briar Cliff Review (2002).  Siobhan Fallon won the 2010 fiction prize for her short story "Burning."  She later included the story in her first book You Know When the Men Are Gone.

Awards
2002 Gold Crown Award
2000 Pacemaker Award
1999 Gold Crown Award
1998 Gold Crown Award
1997 Silver Crown Award
1995 Pacemaker Award
1994 Gold Crown Award
1993 Gold Crown Award
1992 Silver Crown Award

See also
List of literary magazines

References

Briar Cliff Review Awards

External links
The Briar Cliff Review

Literary magazines published in the United States
Magazines established in 1989
Briar Cliff University
Quarterly magazines published in the United States
1989 establishments in Iowa
Magazines published in Iowa